Matthias Klotz (1653–1743) was German luthier, a member of the Klotz family of violin makers that flourished in Mittenwald, Germany as early as 1683.

Biography 
Matthias Klotz (with spelling variations Mathias Khlotz, Khloz, Cloz), was baptized on 11 June 1653 in Mittenwald´s St. Peter and Paul Catholic church, the son of Urban Klotz (Vrbanus Cloz, 1627–1691), a tailor, and his wife Sophia (?-1681).
He died in Mittenwald at age 90 on August 16, 1743. In Mittenwald documents he was repeatedly described as a world-renowned lute and violin maker. He is buried in the cemetery of the St. Nikolaus Church.

Early education 
Klotz became interested in music and instruments in early childhood. Beginning at age 12, from 1672–1678, he took apprenticeship with master Giovanni Railich (Johann Railich), an Italian lute maker at Bottega di Lautaro al Santo in Padua, Italy. 
In 1683, Klotz, now a skilled lute and violin maker, returned prosperous to Mittenwald and established his own workshop.

Style of craftsmanship 
Klotz did not build most of his instruments in the classical Italian style, but made them similar to those of masters from Füssen (a town in Bavaria) and Swabia (Southern Germany). Certain elements of his violins reflect the style of the Tyrolean master luthier Jacob Stainer. Klotz m

Memorial 
A bronze statue of Klotz stands in front of Mittenwald's landmark St. Peter and Paul's Church, at the mouth of the narrow street leading to the Violin-Making Museum (Geigenbaumuseum).

References

Further reading 
 Eitner, Robert (1882). "Klotz, Matthias", Allgemeine Deutsche Biographie (ADB), (16). Leipzig, Duncker & Humblot.
 Senn, Walter (1980). "Klotz, Matthias", Neue Deutsche Biographie (NDB), (12). Berlin, Duncker & Humblot, .

Bowed string instrument makers
1653 births
1743 deaths